Vaithamanidhi Permual Temple (also called Thirukolur) is one of the nine Nava Tirupathi, the Hindu temples dedicated to Vishnu. It is located on the Tiruchendur–Tirunelveli route in Tamil Nadu, India, on the southern bank of the Thamiraparani River, 4 km from Alwarthirunagari. It is the eighth temple of Nava Tirupathi, and is named after Mars (Sevvai) and also called Kuberasthalam. Constructed in the Dravidian style of architecture, the temple is glorified in the Nalayira Divya Prabandham, the early medieval Tamil canon of the Alvar saints from the 6th–9th centuries CE. It is one of the 108 Divya Desams dedicated to Vishnu, who is worshipped as Vaithamanidhi Perumal and his consort Lakshmi as Kolurvalli.

A granite wall surrounds the temple, enclosing all its shrines. The rajagopuram, the temple's gateway tower, is three-tiered in structure. The temple follows Tenkalai tradition of worship. Six daily rituals and three yearly festivals are held at the temple, of which the ten-day annual Vaikuntha Ekadashi during the Tamil month of Margali (December - January) and the Nammalvar birth celebrations with Garudasevai with all nine temple of Navatirupathi, being the most prominent. The temple is maintained and administered by the Hindu Religious and Endowment Board of the Government of Tamil Nadu.

Legend 
According to the temple's regional legend, Kubera, the lord of wealth, was once cursed by Shiva for his lustful glance towards Parvati. Kubera soon realized his mistake and repented for his sin, seeking forgiveness from Shiva and Parvathi. They advised him to perform penance at Thirukkolur. After his penance, Vaithamanithi Perumal blessed him with great wealth again. As per another legend, a king named Ambarisha renounced his crown and became a hermit. He started doing penance in a forest. Sage Durvasa wanted to test his devotion and kicked him. Ambarisha was unmoved which angered Durvasa. He cursed Ambraisa. Ambarisha prayed to Vishnu to help. Pleased by his devotion, Vishnu appeared in the place and relieved him off his curse. Ambarisha built a big temple for Vishnu and called him Ambarisha Varadhar.

Architecture

The Temple has two prakaram, or closed precincts. Vaithamanithi Perumal, the main deity, is in a reclining pose facing east. A Marakka is used as his pillow. He is looking at the palm of his left hand to watch over the location of the wealth. It is believed that people who pray here are blessed with great wealth. The original structure is believed to have been refurbished by Rani Mangammal (1689–1704 CE). The temple is located in Tiruchendur-Tirunelveli route, Tamil Nadu, India in the banks of Thamiraparani river, in the South Indian state of Tamil Nadu. The temple is constructed in Dravidian style of architecture. All the shrines of the temple are located in a rectangular granite structure. The temple has an imposing image of Vishnu, a lotus stalk from the navel of the image emanates the image of Brahma. The feet of the deity can be viewed through the passage. The temple has two prakarams (closed precincts of a temple). The images of the festival images are located inside the sanctum.

Festival and religious practices

The Garuda Sevai utsavam festival in the month of Vaisaki (May–June) witnesses nine Garudasevai, a spectacular event in which festival image idols from the Nava Tirupathi shrines in the area are brought on Garuda vahana, a sacred vehicle of Lord Vishnu. An idol of Nammalvar is also brought here on an Anna Vahanam (palanquin) and his pasurams (verses) dedicated to each of these nine temples are recited. The utsavar (festival deity) of Nammalvar is taken in a palanquin to each of the nine temples through the paddy fields in the area. The verses dedicated to each of the nine Divyadesams are chanted in their respective shrines. This is one of the most important festivals in this area, drawing thousands of visitors.

The temple follows the traditions of the Tenkalai sect of Vaishnavite tradition and follows Pancharathra aagama. The temple priests perform the pooja (rituals) during festivals and on a daily basis. As at other Vishnu temples of Tamil Nadu, the priests belong to the Vaishnava tradition, from the Brahmin community. The temple rituals are performed six times a day: Kalasanthi at 8:00 a.m., Uchikalam at 12:00 p.m., Sayarakshai at 6:00 p.m., and Ardha Jamam at 8:00 p.m. Each ritual has three steps: alangaram (decoration), neivethanam (food offering) and deepa aradanai (waving of lamps) for both Vaithamanidhi and Kolurvalli. During the last step of worship, nagaswaram (pipe instrument) and tavil (percussion instrument) are played, religious instructions in the Vedas (sacred text) are recited by priests, and worshippers prostrate themselves in front of the temple mast. There are weekly, monthly and fortnightly rituals performed in the temple.

Religious significance
Brahmanda Purana, one of the eighteen sacred texts of Hinduism, and written by Veda Vyasa contains a chapter called Navathirupathi Mahatmeeyam. The first part of the chapter refers to Srivaikuntam. Vaikunta Mahatmeeyam is another work in Sanskrit that glorifies the temple and is a part of Tamraparani Sthalapurana available only in palm manuscripts. The temple is revered in Nalayira Divya Prabandham, the 7th–9th century Vaishnava canon, by Nammalvar. The temple is classified as a Divya Desam, one of the 108 Vishnu temples that are mentioned in the book. The temple is also classified as a Navatirupathi, the nine temples revered by Nammalvar located in the banks of Tamiraparani river. During the 18th and 19th centuries, the temple finds mention in several works like 108 Tirupathi Anthathi by Divya Kavi Pillai Perumal Aiyangar. The temple also forms a series of Navagraha temples where each of the nine planetary deities of one of the temples of Navatirupathi. The temple is associated with the planet Angaraka (Mars). It is the birthplace of Madhurakavi Alvar. Chandra, the moon god, is believed to have been relieved off his curse by his prayers in this place.

References

External links

 
Hindu temples in Thoothukudi district
Vishnu temples